Cele De was a contemporary Celtic band based in San Jose, California. The group consisted of Samuel Davidson (violin), Olivia Valderrama (flute, vocals, Irish whistle, piano), Robby Valderrama (guitar, bass, piano), Peter Kistler (percussion, vocals, guitar), and Amy Kistler (violin, vocals).

The band remained together for years after until Davidson moved to San Diego, California in late 2009.  They still have not officially disbanded.

The group's name derives from the Culdee, Kuldee or Céli Dé (lit. "vassals of God") formed an ancient monastic order with settlements in Ireland and Scotland. In early Irish manuscripts the name is Cele De, that is, God's sworn ally. 

Born between 1985 and 1988, the groups youthful energy and brilliant virtuosity has put them among America's most talented musical innovators. They have drawn comparison to bands including Nickel Creek, the Duhks, Jars of Clay, and Seven Nations.

In March 2004, they beat out over 110 bands to win America's Christian Music Showcase. Since then, they have shared the stage with notable Christian acts including Sonic Flood, Sanctus Real, George Huff, Darrell Evans, Monk and Neagle, among others. Finding acclaim in the Celtic/Folk area, they regularly played with the likes of Tempest, the Wicked Tinkers, and the 2005 national banjo champion, Brian Anderson. In 2006, they were scheduled to open for Joy Williams but a scheduling conflict interfered.  They headlined at Spirit West Coast, playing at Cornerstone Music Festival, as well as performing at Don Quixote’s International Music Hall. Their second full-length album was released in July 2006.

Cele De has gained popularity on community sites such as MySpace and PureVolume in recent times.

External links
 Cele De homepage

American folk musical groups
Celtic music groups